Castello d'Argile is a comune (municipality) in the Metropolitan City of Bologna in the Italian region Emilia-Romagna, located about  north of Bologna.

Castello d'Argile borders the following municipalities: Argelato, Cento, Pieve di Cento, Sala Bolognese, San Giorgio di Piano, San Giovanni in Persiceto, San Pietro in Casale.

References

External links
 Official website

Cities and towns in Emilia-Romagna